Albert John Dooley (June 10, 1930 – September 8, 2022) was an American politician in the state of South Carolina. He served in the South Carolina Senate as a member of the Democratic Party from 1971 to 1976 and in the South Carolina House of Representatives from 1959 to 1964, representing Lexington County, South Carolina. Dooley was a lawyer. He died on September 8, 2022, at the age of 92.

References

1930 births
2022 deaths
Democratic Party members of the South Carolina House of Representatives
Democratic Party South Carolina state senators
People from Chapin, South Carolina
South Carolina lawyers
University of South Carolina alumni
University of South Carolina School of Law alumni
20th-century American politicians
20th-century American lawyers